Kon may refer to:

Places 
 Koń, Kuyavian-Pomeranian Voivodeship, Poland
 Kon Tum province, Vietnam 
Kon Tum, capital of Kon Tum province, Vietnam.  
 Karkhaneh-ye Sefid Kon,   a village in Lorestan Province, Iran
 Kon, India, a town in the Thane district of Maharashtra

People

Given name
 Kon, a shorter version of the Greek name Konstantine
 Kon Artis (born 1978), American rapper
 Kon Arimura (born 1976), Japanese radio personality
 Kon Ichikawa (1915–2008), Japanese film director
 Kon Karapanagiotidis, CEO of the Asylum Seeker Resource Centre in Melbourne, Australia
 Kon Sasaki (1918–2009), Japanese photographer 
 Kon Vatskalis (born 1957), Australian politician

Surname
 Kon (surname), list of notable people with the surname

Fiction
 K-On!, a Japanese manga by Kakifly
 Kon (Bleach), a character from Bleach
 Kon Kimidori, a character from Dr. Slump
 Kon-El, a superhero in DC comics
 Kon Kujira, a character from Grojband

Other uses
 Kon (Inca mythology), a god of rain and wind
 Kon or Bō, a Japanese long staff weapon used in bōjutsu
 Kongo language ISO 639 code
 KoN or KON, a short form for the Kingdom of the Netherlands

See also 
 Con (disambiguation)
 Kawaii Kon, an anime convention in Hawaii
 Kon Kan, a Canadian synthpop band
 Kon Keu language, a Mon–Khmer language in the Palaungic family spoken in China
 Kon Khon, 2011 Thai film
 Kon Kon Kokon, Japanese manga series by Koge-Donbo

Japanese masculine given names